Jerry Vincent D'Amigo (born February 19, 1991) is an American professional ice hockey right winger currently playing with Löwen Frankfurt of the Deutsche Eishockey Liga (DEL). D'Amigo was drafted by the Toronto Maple Leafs in the sixth round, 158th overall, of the 2009 NHL Entry Draft.

Playing career

Amateur
D'Amigo graduated from Johnson City High School in 2009 in Johnson City, New York, prior to attending college. D'Amigo played college ice hockey for Rensselaer Polytechnic Institute (RPI) of the ECAC conference in the NCAA. He finished fifth nationally in points per game by a rookie (0.97), led RPI in game-winning goals and finished second on the team in short-handed goals. In his single season in the NCAA, he won the ECAC Rookie of the Year award and was also named to the ECAC Rookie Team.

Professional

D'Amigo was selected in the sixth round, 158th overall of the 2009 NHL Entry Draft by the Toronto Maple Leafs. On August 11, 2010, D'Amigo signed a three-year, National Hockey League (NHL) entry-level contract with Maple Leafs. Due to his contract status with the Maple Leafs, D'Amigo was not allowed to return to the NCAA. D'Amigo attended Maple Leafs training camp ahead of the 2010–11 season, with Toronto having the option to keep him on their NHL roster or assign him to either the American Hockey League (AHL) or to the Ontario Hockey League (OHL)'s Kitchener Rangers, who owned his major junior playing rights. He was ultimately sent to the Toronto Marlies, the Maple Leafs AHL affiliate with the open option to send him to Kitchener prior to February 10, 2011, an option the Maple Leafs eventually exercised just prior to the deadline. Before his assignment to the OHL, he had recorded 14 points in 41 games played with the Marlies. With Kitchener, he finished the 2010–11 OHL season with 12 goals and 16 assists (28 points) in just 21 games played.

The following season, D'Amigo again attended the Maple Leafs training camp, but was cut and sent to the Marlies. He was a key checking forward for the Marlies that season, playing on the team's penalty kill unit. He was cut after only five days at the 2013 Maple Leafs training camp and was assigned to the Marlies. In the 2013–14 season, D'Amigo was named an alternate captain for the Marlies while playing at home in Toronto. On December 5, 2013 D'Amigo was called up to the Maple Leafs for the first time in his career, later making his NHL debut 3–2 Toronto win over the Dallas Stars. On December 14, D'Amigo scored his first career NHL goal against Antti Raanta of the Chicago Blackhawks, also registering his first career NHL assist in the game. D'Amigo played in 22 games registering the one goal and three points. 

On July 1, 2014, D'Amigo, along with a conditional seventh-round pick in the 2015 NHL Entry Draft, was traded to the Columbus Blue Jackets in exchange for former Maple Leaf Matt Frattin. D'Amigo and the Blue Jackets agreed to terms on a one-year, two-way contract on July 29, though he never played for Columbus at the NHL level during his brief tenure with the organization. Later that same year, on December 16, D'Amigo was traded to the Buffalo Sabres in exchange for forward Luke Adam. D'Amigo made his debut with the Sabres on March 3, 2015, against the Tampa Bay Lightning. He split the 2014–15 season in the AHL between the Springfield Falcons and Rochester Americans, scoring 9 goals and 26 points. On July 23, 2015, D'Amigo signed a one year, two-way contract with the Sabres. D'Amigo spent the 2015–16 season with Rochester. 

He was unable to attract a NHL contract as a free agent, D'Amigo ventured to Finland for the following season, signing with Ilves of the country's top-flight Liiga on October 16, 2016. In his first season abroad, D'Amigo quickly transitioned to the European style game in the 2016–17 campaign, contributing with 13 goals and 33 points in 48 regular season games and adding 1 point in 10 playoff games. Following Ilves postseason exit, D'Amigo left the club as a free agent. Without a contract over the summer, he belatedly opted to continue in Finland, agreeing to a one-year contract with KalPa on October 12, 2017, for the 2017–18 season.

After two seasons in Finland, D'Amigo left as free agent to sign a one-year deal with German outfit, ERC Ingolstadt of the Deutsche Eishockey Liga (DEL) on July 17, 2018. D'Amigo finished the season with 18 goals and 43 points in 52 games. He re-signed the following off-season for a second season with Ingolstadt. In his second season D'Amigo registered 9 goals and 22 points in 41 games.

Returning to North America, D'Amigo signed as a free agent to join the Orlando Solar Bears of the East Coast Hockey League on December 7, 2020. In the 2020–21 season, D'Amigo played in 14 games with the Solar Bears before he returned to the AHL in signing a professional tryout contract (PTO) with the Colorado Eagles on February 8, 2021. He made 3 regular season appearances with the Eagles, registering 7 penalty minutes, before he was released from his PTO and returned to the Solar Bears on February 23, 2021.

As a free agent following the season, D'Amigo returned for a second stint in Germany, agreeing to a one-year contract with Düsseldorfer EG of the DEL on August 4, 2021. D'Amigo collected 9 goals and 25 points in 53 games. He signed as a free agent with Löwen Frankfurt of the DEL on November 7, 2022.

International play

D'Amigo represented the under-18 United States team for the first time in his career at the 2009 IIHF World U18 Championships, where he helped them win the gold medal and led Team USA in scoring; he was also fifth overall in tournament scoring, with 13 points. He represented the United States at the junior level at the 2010 World Junior Ice Hockey Championships, where he won gold and finished fourth in tournament scoring, with 12 points. He represented the U.S. at the junior level once again at the 2011 World Junior Ice Hockey Championships, where he won bronze and finished with two points scored.

Career statistics

Regular season and playoffs

International

Awards and honors

References

External links

1991 births
Living people
American men's ice hockey right wingers
Buffalo Sabres players
Colorado Eagles players
Düsseldorfer EG players
ERC Ingolstadt players
Ice hockey players from New York (state)
Ilves players
KalPa players
Kitchener Rangers players
Löwen Frankfurt players
Orlando Solar Bears (ECHL) players
Rochester Americans players
RPI Engineers men's ice hockey players
Sportspeople from Binghamton, New York
Springfield Falcons players
Toronto Maple Leafs draft picks
Toronto Maple Leafs players
Toronto Marlies players
USA Hockey National Team Development Program players